The 1958 Wisconsin gubernatorial election was held on November 4, 1958. Republican incumbent Vernon Wallace Thomson was defeated by Democratic nominee Gaylord Nelson with 53.59% of the vote.

As of 2018, this marks the last occasion that Vilas County has voted Democratic in a gubernatorial election.

General election

Candidates
Vernon Wallace Thomson (Republican), Attorney General of Wisconsin from 1951 to 1953, Governor of Wisconsin since 1953.
Gaylord Nelson (Democrat), member of the Wisconsin State Senate since 1948.
Wayne Leverenz (Socialist Workers Party)

Results

References

1958
Wisconsin
Gubernatorial